Peter Boden (born 18 September 1947) is a British former sports shooter.

Sports shooting career
Boden competed at four Summer Olympics; the 1976 Summer Olympics, 1984 Summer Olympics, 1996 Summer Olympics and 2000 Summer Olympics.

He represented England and won a gold medal in the clay pigeon trap and a silver medal in the trap pairs with Peter Croft, at the 1982 Commonwealth Games in Brisbane, Queensland, Australia. Four years later he represented England and won a silver medal in the clay pigeon trap and a gold medal in the trap pairs with Ian Peel, at the 1986 Commonwealth Games in Edinburgh, Scotland.

References

1947 births
Living people
British male sport shooters
Sportspeople from Newcastle-under-Lyme
Olympic shooters of Great Britain
Shooters at the 1976 Summer Olympics
Shooters at the 1984 Summer Olympics
Shooters at the 1996 Summer Olympics
Shooters at the 2000 Summer Olympics
Shooters at the 1982 Commonwealth Games
Shooters at the 1986 Commonwealth Games
Commonwealth Games medallists in shooting
Commonwealth Games gold medallists for England
Commonwealth Games silver medallists for England
Medallists at the 1982 Commonwealth Games
Medallists at the 1986 Commonwealth Games